Public Bath House No. 2 is a historic public bath located at Yonkers, Westchester County, New York. It was built in 1898 and is a two-story, three bay wide building built of yellowish-orange brick in the Romanesque style.  It features a wide, centrally placed segmental-arched window.  The interior was in three sections: reception area, custodian's apartment, and the baths.  It was modernized in 1928 and decommissions, gutted, and rebuilt as a church in 1962.  As of January 2011, it was home to the Mt. Hebron Apostolic Church.

It was added to the National Register of Historic Places in 1985.

References

Romanesque Revival architecture in New York (state)
Commercial buildings completed in 1898
Buildings and structures in Yonkers, New York
1898 establishments in New York (state)
National Register of Historic Places in Yonkers, New York
Public baths on the National Register of Historic Places in New York (state)
Public baths in the United States